Alexino is a rural locality (a village) in Pekshinskoye Rural Settlement, Petushinsky District, Vladimir Oblast, Russia. The population was 1 as of 2010.

Geography 
Alexino is located 44 km northeast of Petushki (the district's administrative centre) by road. Vasilki is the nearest rural locality.

References 

Rural localities in Petushinsky District